Season three of the 2017 edition of El Gran Show premiered on September 2, 2017.

The season was also named "La Revancha", due to the return of former participants for a new opportunity to win the competition.

On October 14, 2017, Anahí de Cárdenas and her professional dancer George Neyra were crowned champions, Vania Bludau and Oreykel Hidalgo  finished second, while César Távara and Alexa Montoya finished third. In this way, Neyra became the second professional dancer two times champion, after Lucas Piró, since he also won Reyes de Show of 2015.

Cast

Couples 
On September 2, 2017, participants and their professional dancers were presented at the first week. Nine celebrities were announced, of which six returned from previous seasons and three were new to the show (Emilio Jaime, Fernanda Kanno, and Aldo Olcese). During the show, boxer Jonathan Maicelo left the competition due to an injury, so former contestant Cesar Távara took his place in the competition.

Hosts and judges 
Gisela Valcárcel and  Aldo Díaz returned as host while Morella Petrozzi, Carlos Cacho, Tilsa Lozano and Pachi Valle Riestra returned as judges.

Scoring charts 

Red numbers indicate the sentenced for each week
Green numbers indicate the best steps for each week
"—" indicates the couple(s) did not dance that week
 the couple was eliminated that week
 the couple was safe in the duel
  the couple was eliminated that week and safe with a lifeguard
 the winning couple
 the runner-up couple
 the third-place couple

Average score chart 
This table only counts dances scored on a 40-point scale.

Highest and lowest scoring performances 
The best and worst performances in each dance according to the judges' 40-point scale are as follows:

Couples' highest and lowest scoring dances 
Scores are based upon a potential 40-point maximum.

Weekly scores 
Individual judges' scores in the charts below (given in parentheses) are listed in this order from left to right: Morella Petrozzi, Carlos Cacho, Tilsa Lozano, Pachi Valle Riestra.

 Week 1: First Dances 
The couples danced cumbia, reggaeton or salsa. Due to personal reasons, Angie Jibaja could not appear in the show, even though the sentence was carried out.
Running order

 Week 2: Cumbia Night 
The couples (except those sentenced) danced cumbia.

Due to an injury, Jonathan Maicelo leaves the competition being replaced by César Távara, for this reason the duel was canceled.
Running order

 Week 3: Bachata & Salsa Night 
The couples (except those sentenced) danced bachata or salsa.

Due to personal issue, Fernanda Kanno was not present this week's live show, being replaced by so former contestant, Leslie Shaw.
Running order

The duel*
Melissa & Ítalo: Safe
Aldo & Gabriella: Eliminated

 Week 4: Characterization Night 
The couples performed a one unlearned dance being characterized to popular music icons.
Running order

The duel*
Melissa & Ítalo: Safe
Angie & Horacio: Eliminated (but safe with the lifeguard)
Christian & Isabel: Safe

 Week 5: Past Night 
The couples performed one unlearned dance to celebrate the past years of their lives.
Running order

The duel*
Fernanda & Sergio: Eliminated 
Melissa & Ítalo: Safe
Anahí & George: Eliminated (but safe with the lifeguard)

 Week 6: Semifinals 
The couples performed one dance in which they had to sing at the beginning of the performance.
Running order

The duel*
Angie & Horacio: Eliminated 
César & Alexa: Eliminated (but safe with the lifeguard)
Melissa & Ítalo: Safe

 Week 7: Finals 
On the first part, the couples danced freestyle.

On the second part, the five finalist couples danced salsa.

On the third part, the three finalists couples danced viennese waltz.
Running order (Part 1)

Running order (Part 2)

Running order (Part 3)

Dance chart
The celebrities and professional partners will dance one of these routines for each corresponding week:
 Week 1: Cumbia, reggaeton or salsa (First Dances)
 Week 2: Cumbia (Cumbia Night)
 Week 3: Bachata or salsa (Bachata & Salsa Night)
 Week 4: One unlearned dance (Characterization Night)
 Week 5: One unlearned dance (Past Night)
 Week 6: One dance singing (Semifinals)
 Week 7: Freestyle, salsa & viennese waltz (Final)

"—" indicates the couple did not dance that week 
 Highest scoring dance
 Lowest scoring dance
In Italic'' indicate the dance performed in the duel

Guest judges

Notes

References

External links

El Gran Show
2017 Peruvian television seasons
Reality television articles with incorrect naming style